Leiv Eirikson Discovering America is a painting by Christian Krohg. It depicts the explorer Leif Erikson at the moment he discovers American land, as described in the sagas of Icelanders. The painting was made for the Chicago World's Fair in 1893 and was exhibited along with the Viking ship replica Viking. It is in the collection of the National Museum of Art, Architecture and Design in Oslo.

Background
Christian Krohg (1852–1925) was a Norwegian painter and novelist. He came to prominence in Norway in the 1880s as a leading naturalist and as one of the Kristiania Bohemians. Beginning with Babord litt from 1879, he made several paintings depicting sailors and maritime pilots. Leiv Eirikson Discovering America can be counted to this group. It was commissioned in 1891 by the Leif Erikson Memorial Association in Chicago, an organisation set up by Norwegian Americans, which invited Krohg and other painters to a contest where they would paint Leif Erikson's discovery of America, as described in the medieval sagas of Icelanders. The winning painting would be exhibited at the World's Columbian Exposition—the Chicago World's Fair of 1893. Krohg's painting won and was sent to Chicago.

Subject and composition
Leiv Eirikson Discovering America is painted in oil on canvas with the dimensions . The painting presents a view from the deck of Leif Erikson's ship, looking out over the waves with land visible in the distance to the left. To the right in the picture is the title figure, holding the rudder and wearing a mustard-coloured tunic. He stands straight and points toward the land in the horizon. A few other men on deck are hunching and look seasick.

Analysis and reception
The role Leiv Eirikson Discovering America played in American society has been associated with Scandinavian immigration, as the stories of pre-Columbian Nordic voyages to North America formed a part of Scandinavian American assimilation into American nationhood. In the late 19th and early 20th centuries, this narrative of identity caused some conflict with Italian Americans, as the discovery of America by Christopher Columbus had a similar role in their assimilation process. Leiv Eirikson Discovering America was featured at the Chicago World's Fair along with the ship Viking, a replica of the Viking Age Gokstad ship, which sailed from Norway to the United States and anchored at Chicago's Jackson Park in time for the event. Much literature associated with the world's fair, including official programs, incorrectly identified both Viking and the ship in Krohg's painting as exact replicas of the ship Leif Erikson had sailed across the Atlantic. The large painting became a popular attraction for those who had missed Vikings arrival or wanted to relive it.

Analyzing the painting in 2019, historian Eleanor Rosamund Barraclough says Leif "radiates strength and leadership" and is depicted with a purposefulness which contrasts with the other men in the image. The historian Johnni Langer places Leiv Eirikson Discovering America in the same European tradition of depicting Viking voyages as Oscar Wergeland's The Norwegians Land in Iceland Year 872 (1877), and contrasts it with Arrival of the Viking in America (1845) by the German American Emanuel Leutze. This European tradition is distinguished from the American by avoiding humorous features.

Provenance

Leiv Eirikson Discovering America won the Leif Erikson Memorial Association's contest and was part of the Chicago World's Fair. The world's fair also featured two paintings by Krohg's wife Oda Krohg. The first years after the world's fair, Leiv Eirikson Discovering America was without a permanent home. In 1900, the Leif Erikson Memorial Association gifted it to the National Gallery in Oslo, now part of Norway's National Museum of Art, Architecture and Design. It was placed above the National Gallery's entrance stairs. 

In February 2023, the painting was removed from display and placed in storage. Stina Högkvist, the department director at the National Museum explained the situation to the Aftenposten newspaper, saying; "The picture is a romanticization of Norwegians who went to America. It is a colonialist image" and further adding "We are now showing more female artists, more Sámi artists and more art by people whom were not born with white skin. We shall continue with this. We must have a socially relevant, fresh look at the history of art". 

Criticism of this was swift from politicians, art historians and the general public. Eivor Evenrud from Oslo City Council's Culture and Education Committee called the decision completely absurd. Stina Högkvist would soon later apologize and clarify in response to the criticism, stating that her remark was sloppy and poorly thought out, and that she didn't actually believe that the painting was colonialist.

The catalogue for Norway's exhibition at the Chicago World's Fair lists the painting's name as Leif Erikson Discovering America. The National Museum of Art, Architecture and Design uses the name Leiv Eirikson Discovering America.

References

External links
 

1893 paintings
Paintings by Christian Krohg
Paintings in the collection of the National Gallery (Norway)
Cultural depictions of Leif Erikson
History paintings
Maritime paintings
Works based on sagas
World's Columbian Exposition